Tharangam (Malayalam :  തരംഗം) is a 2017 Indian Malayalam-language Fantasy black comedy film directed by debutante Dominic Arun. It was the first Malayalam film produced by Dhanush under his banner Wunderbar Films, and starring Tovino Thomas, Balu Varghese, Santhy Balachandran in the lead roles. Ashwin Renju is the music director. The film released in India on 29 September 2017.

Plot 
The movie tells about Pappan, a cop along with the struggles led with Joy.C. They land in trouble while investigating Ommana, who is the wife of a dreaded don named Raghu. They cross paths with a smuggler Siju, and Raghu, which leads to a chaotic situation.

Cast  
 Tovino Thomas as Padmanabhan "Pappan"
 Balu Varghese as Joy. C
 Santhy Balachandran as Malini (Malu)
 Neha Iyer as Omana
 Dileesh Pothan as God
 Sijoy Varghese as Christopher Luke
 Vijaya Raghavan as Menon
 Manoj K Jayan as Antony Gonsalvez
 Shammy Thilakan as Tharian
 Saiju Kurup as Siju
 Alencier Ley Lopez as Ittymani
 Abin Paul as Jimmy
 Unni Lalu as Deepu
 Sarath Sabha as Appukuttan
 Unni Mukundan as Reghu (Cameo appearance)

Production
Tharangam is the first Malayalam film produced by Tamil actor Dhanush.Sukumar Thekkepat was the executive producer of the film. It is the directorial debut of Dominic Arun, who has previously directed short films. The film is made as a black comedy.

Release
Tharangam was released in 106 screens across Kerala on 29 September 2017.

Critical response

Critic Veeyen writes: "Tharangam' is a wickedly dark movie and one crazy ride, a work of comic insanity that asks you to buckle your seat belts on, simply feel the air rush against your face and let things be." He later on adds, "It could only be a real zany mind that would have the nerve to start off his film as this, and Dominic Arun within minutes has the audience dropping their jaws – either in amazement or in morbid fear of what’s in store for the next couple of hours."

Anagha Jayan E from Malayala Manorama wrote: Dominic Arun's Tharangam unfurls its suspense-thriller plot in a very unconventional black-comedy mood. A normal action-thriller movie by all other means, Tharangam wangles an offbeat stamp through an avant-garde style of narration that fiddles with fantasy and magic realism.

Anjana George for The Times of India rated the film 3.5 out of 5 stars and wrote : Dominic Arun has successfully tried to serve a fantasy thriller which is a blend of Priyadarshan and Quentin Tarantino movies. It has well-narrated romance, suspense, action and emotions. If you are in the mood for a thrilling, fantasy movie, Tharangam is your best bet this season.

Soumya Rajendran for The News Minute rated Tharangam as 'A smart black comedy with a superb screen play'and wrote Debut director Dominic Arun's Tharangam is a smart black comedy with a racy screenplay and intricate plot.

Deepthi Sreenivasan for Deccan Chronicle rated Tharangam as 'Tovino's comic timing is spot on, complemented by Balu's performance'.
Full of twists that would keep one on their toes, Tharangam is an unconventional black comedy, that visits Malayali screens rarely.

Meena Suresh for The New Indian Express said 'What makes Tharangam very unique is its narrative style. It manages to blend in fantasy and realism'

References

External links
 

2017 films
2010s Malayalam-language films